Edward George Thompson (born 15 December 1906) was a rugby union player who represented Australia.

Thompson, a prop, was born in Dalby, Queensland and claimed a total of 4 international rugby caps for Australia.

References

Australian rugby union players
Australia international rugby union players
1906 births
Year of death missing
Rugby union players from Queensland
Rugby union props